is a Japanese actor. He is best known for the roles of Kyōsuke Kiriya in the 2005 tokusatsu series Kamen Rider Hibiki, Otoya Hanazono in the 2006 midnight drama Princess Princess D, and Yuto Sakurai/Kamen Rider Zeronos in the 2007 tokusatsu series Kamen Rider Den-O.

Nakamura was affiliated with the acting group D-Boys produced by Watanabe Entertainment.

In 2012, he announced he would be taking a break from show business, but in 2014 he announced he had been signed to a new talent agency, G-Star.Pro.

Career
Nakamura started his career in entertainment in 2003, joining the talent agency Johnny & Associates under the Johnny's Jr. division. However, through his time in Johnny's Jr., Nakamura realized he had more interest in pursuing a career in acting than in music, despite the passion for dance that motivated him to join the agency. When Watanabe Entertainment's action production group D-Boys announced its first public audition searching for new talents in 2004, Nakamura left Johnny & Associates to try for the new group that conformed more to the career he sought.

On July 27, 2004, Nakamura performed in the D-Boys Open Audition, and came in as the Grand Prize winner. He joined the group shortly after, along with runner-up Shunji Igarashi and third-placer Katsuki Nakamura. Nakamura was one of the constantly-expanding group's longest-standing members.

In March 2010, Nakamura became part of a new D-Boys sub-unit named D-Date alongside Shunji Igarashi, Kōji Seto, Hirofumi Araki and Arata Horii, but had to leave due to health reasons and medical treatment. Despite recovering, on September 25, 2012, he resigned from his agency, retiring from the entertainment industry.

He returns to the show business on August 31, 2014.

On December 18, 2022, Nakamura announces his marriage to a general woman.

Filmography

Television

Cinema

Other media

Radio
 Sunday Talking D-Theater feat. Yuichi Nakamura -I'll always be beside you- (2009)
 D-Boys Be Ambitious (2010)

Theatre
 Please Me (2005)
 Limit - Anata no monogatari wa nan desu ka? (2005)
 Sophistry (2006)
 Out of Order (2007)
 D-Boys Stage Vol.1:  Kanbai Onrei (2007)
 Adult na Onnatachi (2007)
 Aru Hi, Bokura wa Yume no Naka de Deau (2007)
 D-Boys Stage Vol.2: Last Game (2008)
 D-Boys Stage Vol.3: ~Karasu~ 10 (2009)
 D-Boys Stage 2010: Trial-2: Last Game (2010)

Voice acting
 Kemono no Gotoku Hisoyaka Ni: Kotodama Tsukai drama CD (2007)
 Kamen Rider Battle: Ganbaride video game (2008)
 Bihada Ichizoku anime (2008)
 Kamen Rider: Battride War Genesis video game (2016)

Endorsements
 Kentucky Fried Chicken: Arigato no Uta (2007)
 Sapporo Beverage: Gerolsteiner (2008)

Promotional media
Nakamura has been featured in the following promotional releases:

CDs
 Princess Princess D: Character Song Series Vol.2: Shiawase no Yokan - Yuichi Nakamura, Kento Shibuya & Kazuma
 Kamen Rider Den-O: Action-Zero - Yuichi Nakamura & Hōchū Ōtsuka
 Doukyuusei/Taiikukan Baby: Doukyusei,Taiikukan Baby - Yuichi Nakamura
 Bokura no Houteishiki: Futari dake no Happy Birthday -with Bokushiki Member-  - Honey L Days with Bokushiki Member
 Kamen Rider Den-O: Action-Zero 2010 - Yuichi Nakamura & Hōchū Ōtsuka

DVDs
 Princess Princess D: Character Image DVD vol.2 (2006/10)
 Kamen Rider Den-O: I'm Born! making DVD -from the den-liner's window- (2007/07)
 Kamen Rider Den-O: Special Talk Show -close in, all imagin! it's climax!- (2007/11)
 Kamen Rider Den-O: Final Stage and Cast Talk Show (2008/04)
 Boku no Hoteishiki: Actor Nakamura Yuichi (2008/10)
 Kamen Rider Den-O & Kiva: Climax Deka: Collector's pack plus Den-Kiva festival (2008/11)
 D-Boys Boy Friend series vol.2: Yuichi Nakamura Self-Discovery (2009/08)
 Making Of Wangan Midnight The Movie ~Asakura Akio in Akuma no Z~ (2009/08)
 D-Boys Boy Friend series vol.7: 7 HEROES (2010/02)
 Kamen Rider × Kamen Rider × Kamen Rider The Movie: Cho-Den-O Trilogy: Imagin super climax tour 2010 (2010/09)

Photobooks
 D-Boys: D-Boys (2005/04)
 D-Boys: Start! (2006/03)
 Official Photo Album Princess Princess D (2006/08)
 Princess Princess D Making Book (2006/10)
 Kamen Rider Den-O Character Book vol. 01 (2007/08 )
 Den-O Perspective (2008/01 )
 Kamen Rider Den-O Character Book vol. 02 (2008/03 )
 Yuichi (2008/03 ) - solo photobook
 D-Boys in the movie: Shakariki! (2008/08)
 Den-O Final Invitation (2008/09 )
 Bokura no Houteishiki: Official Photobook (2008/09 )
 D-Boys: Dash! (2008/12)
 Den-O Neo Generation!! [+ Decade] (2009/06 )
 D-Boys: Darling (2010/03 )
 Kamen Rider × Kamen Rider × Kamen Rider The Movie: Cho-Den-O Trilogy: Episode Red Official Guide Book (2010/05 )
 Kamen Rider × Kamen Rider × Kamen Rider The Movie: Cho-Den-O Trilogy: Character Book (2010/06 )
 Kamen Rider × Kamen Rider × Kamen Rider The Movie: Cho-Den-O Trilogy: Complete Book -DEN-O TRILOGIC- (2010/07 )
 Birth -Standing There- (2010/10) - solo photobook

References

External links
 Official profile 
 Official blog 

1987 births
Japanese male film actors
Japanese male television actors
Male actors from Yokohama
Living people
21st-century Japanese male actors